Real One is a song by American R&B singer Chanté Moore, taken from her seventh studio album The Rise of the Phoenix (2017). The song was released on February 3, 2017, through CM7 Records. The song was written by Moore and Lil' Ronnie and produced by Ronnie.

Background and release
In an interview with Rolling Out March 8, 2017, Moore talked about the track stating "I’m more excited by this record than I have been in a really long time. It’s my seventh solo album. It’s 2017. My birthday just passed, 2/17. We just did a video that will be out really soon. I am in love and I wrote about it. After six years of being single, I got a man … for real."

Critical reception
The song was met with a positive response from critics. ThisisRnB praised the song "Moore celebrates and salutes the magic of real love on the radiant song." Singersroom branded the track as "a feel-good vibe".

Music video
The music video was released to Moore's YouTube channel on March 20, 2017.

Formats and track listings
Digital download
 "Real One" – 3:32

Chart performance
"Real One" debuted at number twenty 29 on the Adult R&B Songs chart on April 1, 2017. In the songs sixteenth week the song peaked at number thirteen. In its twentyfirst week the song peaked at number 10.

Charts

Weekly charts

Year-end charts

Release history

References

2017 songs
2017 singles
Chanté Moore songs
Songs written by Lil' Ronnie
Songs written by Chanté Moore